Vilaasam is a 2014 Indian Tamil-language action drama film written and directed by Pa. Rajaganesan. The film stars Pawan and Sanam Shetty in the lead roles. It was released on 14 November 2014, and was later dubbed and released in Telugu under the same name.

Cast 

 Pawan as Shiva (Seesa)
 Sanam Shetty as Abhi
 Aadukalam Naren as Pandian
 Aruldoss as Bawa
 Rajendran 
 Raj Kapoor
 Bava Lakshmanan
 Cheran Raj
 Sujibala
 Shamili
 Sharmila
 Bose Venkat
 Chetan
 King Kong
 Kottachi

Production 
The film was directed by debutant Raja Ganesan, with Pawan and Sanam Shetty picked to play the lead roles.

Soundtrack 
The soundtrack was composed by Ravi Raaghav.

Release and reception 
The film was released on 14 November 2014, alongside six other films in Tamil Nadu. The New Indian Express noted that the film was an "appreciable effort by a debutant maker", concluding that it was a "gripping tale about identity".

A critic from Maalai Malar gave the film a positive review, praising the performance of the lead actors. Likewise, critics from Dinamalar and IFlicks.com also gave the film positive reviews.

References 

2010s Tamil-language films
2014 films
Indian action drama films
2014 action drama films